Wildenberg is a municipality in the county of Kelheim, Bavaria, Germany.

Wildenberg may also refer to:

 Wildenberg Castle (Kirchzell),  a ruined castle in the Odenwald hills in Bavaria, Germany
 Wildenberg Castle (Zernez) in Zernez in the Lower Engadine, canton of Graubünden, Switzerland

See also
 Wildberg (disambiguation)
 Wildenburg (disambiguation)